Hemispheres is United Airlines' inflight magazines. The magazine is circulated monthly and reaches 139 million passengers annually. The magazine was formerly produced in Greensboro, North Carolina. It is currently produced in New York City.

Hemispheres was established in 1992. Its editorial coverage includes its signature ‘3 Perfect Days’ travel piece, and the latest news in business, travel, fashion, and culture. The magazine reaches a highly influential business and leisure traveller audience, with a median household income of $128,000, spending and profession. 

In 2009, Ink was appointed as the new publisher for United Hemispheres. Ink's first issue of Hemispheres was placed on all United Airlines and United Airlines Express flights on March 1, 2009.

References

External links
United Hemispheres Magazine website 
Hemispheres '3 Perfect Days'
Ink Website

Lifestyle magazines published in the United States
Monthly magazines published in the United States
Inflight magazines
Magazines established in 1992
Magazines published in New York City
Magazines published in North Carolina
Mass media in Greensboro, North Carolina
Tourism magazines
United Airlines